Uedson Ney dos Santos (born February 23, 1981), better known as Ney Santos, is a Brazilian footballer.

Career
Born in Maruim, Sergipe, Santos played for Brazilian clubs Confiança, Bahia, Vitória, Atlético Paranaense, Sport Recife, Coritiba, América-RN, and Joinville, before moving in 2008 to Portuguese club C.F. Estrela da Amadora.

After leaving C.F. Estrela da Amadora, the Brazilian winger has signed a two years contract with S.C. Braga on 26 June 2009. He's currently on a loan spell at Vitória F.C. On 19 May 2014, his contract was renewed for another season.

References

1981 births
Living people
Brazilian footballers
Associação Desportiva Confiança players
Esporte Clube Bahia players
Esporte Clube Vitória players
Club Athletico Paranaense players
Sport Club do Recife players
Coritiba Foot Ball Club players
América Futebol Clube (RN) players
Joinville Esporte Clube players
C.F. Estrela da Amadora players
Primeira Liga players
Brazilian expatriate footballers
Expatriate footballers in Portugal
Association football defenders
Sportspeople from Sergipe